Arthur Muchera Museve is retired Kenyan defender who turned for Kenyan Premier League sides Securicor, World Hope FC and Nairobi City Stars.

Career
Arthur started out at Kenyan Premier League side Securicor in 2003 before joining Nairobi City Stars in 2004, and  went on to serve in the top flight till the team's relegation at the end of the 2016 season. 

He stayed at the club for a further three seasons; 2017, 2018 and 2018/19 as the team competed in the second tier, before finally calling it a day to join the technical bench as a trainer.

Arthur was best known for headers and penalties, and top-scored for the club in the 2008 season with seven goals, and in the 2009 season with ten goals.

Honours

Club
World Hope
 KFF Nationwide Champion: (2004) 
 FKF President's Cup: (2005)

References

External links
 

1981 births
Living people
Kenyan footballers
Nairobi City Stars players
Kenyan Premier League players